The economy of Vietnam is a mixed socialist-oriented market economy, which is the 36th-largest in the world as measured by nominal gross domestic product (GDP) and 26th-largest in the world as measured by purchasing power parity (PPP) in 2022. Vietnam is a member of the Asia-Pacific Economic Cooperation, the Association of Southeast Asian Nations and the World Trade Organization.

Since the mid-1980s, through the Đổi Mới reform period, Vietnam has made a shift from a highly centralized command economy to a mixed economy. This economy uses both directive and indicative planning through five-year plans, with support from an open market-based economy. Over that period, the economy has experienced rapid growth. In the 21st century, Vietnam is in a period of being integrated into the global economy. Almost all Vietnamese enterprises are small and medium enterprises (SMEs). Vietnam has become a leading agricultural exporter and served as an attractive destination for foreign investment in Southeast Asia. In the current period, Vietnam's economy relies largely on foreign direct investment to attract the capital from overseas to support its continual economic rigor. Foreign investment on the luxury hotels sector and resorts will rise to support high-end tourist industry.

According to a forecast by PricewaterhouseCoopers in February 2017, Vietnam may be the fastest-growing of the world's economies, with a potential annual GDP growth rate of about 5.1%, which would make its economy the 10th-largest in the world by 2050. Vietnam has also been named among the Next Eleven and CIVETS countries. Despite economic achievement following Doi Moi, there exist issues that cause many analysts and researchers to remain worried about the recent economic slowdown in the country.

History

Before 1858 
Civilization in Vietnam had been built on agriculture. The feudal dynasties always considered agriculture as the main economic base, and their economic thoughts have been predicated on physiocracy. Land ownership was regulated, and such large-scale works as dykes were constructed in the Red River Delta to facilitate wet rice cultivation. In peaceful times, soldiers were sent home to do farm work. Furthermore, the court prohibited slaughtering water buffalo and cattle and held many agriculture-related ceremonies. Handicrafts and art were valued, but commerce was deprecated, and businessmen were called by the derogatory term con buôn. Thang Long (Hanoi) was the main handicraft manufacturing center of the country. Chinese noted that the Vietnamese were doing business just like the same with in the Chinese Song dynasty. From the 9th to 13th century, the Vietnamese traded ceramics and silks with regional powers such as China, Champa, Western Xia, Java among others. Further archeological evidence suggests that Muslim traders had lived in Hanoi from around the 9th to 10th centuries, based on Muslim ceramics found in the Old Quarter of Hanoi.

However, from the 16th century, Confucianism was losing its influence on Vietnamese society and a monetary pre-capitalism economy began to develop. During the Lê–Mạc period, the state encouraged semi-industrial business and sea-traders, as the Vietnamese economy would mainly depended on them for the next 250 years. Cities such as Dong Kinh, Hội An and others grew quickly under rapid urbanization. They were later constrained when foreign nations saw them as an economic threat.

During the 17th century, Vietnam's economy had reached its peak as the country was the third-largest economic power in East Asia and Southeast Asia. In the late 18th century, the economy suffered depression because of a series of diseases and disaster such as the Tay Son peasant rebellion which devastated the country. In 1806, Emperor Gia Long of the new Nguyễn dynasty imposed the "Sea Ban policy", which banned all Vietnamese overseas business and stopped Western merchants from entering Vietnam. This policy led to stagnation of the Vietnamese economy in the early-19th century, and contributed to Vietnam becoming a French colony.

1858–1975 
Until the French colonization in the mid-19th century, Vietnam's economy had been mostly agrarian, subsistence-based and village-oriented. French colonizers, however, deliberately developed the regions differently as the French needed raw materials and a market for French manufactured goods, designating the South for agricultural production as it was better suited for agriculture, and the North for manufacturing as it was naturally wealthy in mineral resources. Though the plan exaggerated regional divisions, the development of exports—coal from the North, rice from the South—and the importation of French manufactured goods stimulated domestic commerce.

The separation distorted the basic Vietnamese economy by overly stressing regional economic differences. In the South, while irrigated rice remained the principal subsistence crop, the French introduced plantation agriculture with products such as tea, cotton, and tobacco. The colonial government also developed some extractive industries, such as the mining of coal, iron, and nonferrous metals. A shipbuilding industry was begun in Hanoi;  railroads, roads, power stations, and hydraulics works were constructed. In the South, agricultural development concentrated on rice cultivation, and, nationally, rice and rubber were the main items of export. Domestic and foreign trade were centered around the Saigon-Cholon area. Industry in the South consisted mostly of food-processing plants and factories producing consumer goods.

When the North and South were divided politically in 1954, they also adopted different economic ideologies: socialism in the North and capitalism in the South. Destruction caused by the Second Indochina War from 1954 to 1975 seriously strained the economy. The situation was worsened by the country's 1.5 million military and civilian deaths, and the subsequent exodus of 1 million refugees, including tens of thousands of professionals, intellectuals, technicians and skilled workers out of the millions of war refugees.

my life 

The government's Second Five-Year Plan (1976–1981) aimed for solid high annual growth rates in industrial and agricultural sectors and national income and sought to integrate the North and the South, but the goals were not attained. The economy remained dominated by small-scale production, low labor productivity, material and technological shortfalls, and insufficient food and consumer goods. The more modest goals of the Third Five-Year Plan (1981–85) were a compromise between ideological and pragmatic factions; they emphasized the development of agriculture and industry. Efforts were also made to decentralize planning and improve the managerial skills of government officials.

After reunification in 1975, the economy of Vietnam was plagued by enormous difficulties in production, imbalances in supply and demand, inefficiencies in distribution and circulation, soaring inflation rates, and rising debt problems. Vietnam is one of the few countries in modern history to experience a sharp economic deterioration in a postwar reconstruction period. Its peacetime economy was one of the poorest in the world and had shown a negative to very slow growth in total national output as well as in agricultural and industrial production. Vietnam's gross domestic product ( GDP) in 1984 was valued at US$18.1 billion with a per capita income estimated to be between US$200 and US$300 per year. Reasons for this mediocre economic performance have included severe climatic conditions that afflicted agricultural crops, bureaucratic mismanagement, elimination of private ownership, extinction of entrepreneurial classes in the South, and military occupation of Cambodia (which resulted in a cutoff of much-needed international aid for reconstruction).

From the late 1970s until the early 1990s, Vietnam was a member of the Comecon, and therefore was heavily dependent on trade with the Soviet Union and its allies. Following the dissolution of the Comecon and the loss of its traditional trading partners, Vietnam was forced to liberalize trade, devalue its exchange rate to increase exports, and embark on a policy of economic development.  Between 1975 and 1994, the United States imposed a trade embargo on Vietnam, forbidding any trade during the 19-year period.

In 1986, Vietnam launched a political and economic renewal campaign (Đổi Mới) that introduced reforms to facilitate the transition from a centralized economy to a "socialist-oriented market economy". Đổi Mới combined government planning with free-market incentives and encouraged the establishment of private businesses and foreign investment, including foreign-owned enterprises. Furthermore, the Vietnam government stressed the necessity to lower birth rates when developing the economic and social rights of the population by implementing a policy that restricted the number of children per household to two, called the two-child policy. By the late 1990s, the success of the business and agricultural reforms ushered in under Đổi Mới was evident. More than 30,000 private businesses had been created, the economy was growing at an annual rate of more than 7%, and poverty was nearly halved.

Throughout the 1990s, exports increased by as much as 20% to 30% in some years. In 1999, exports accounted for 40% of GDP, an impressive performance in the midst of the economic crisis that hit other countries in Asia. Vietnam became a member of the World Trade Organization (WTO) in 2007, which freed Vietnam from textile quotas enacted worldwide as part of the Multi Fibre Arrangement (MFA) in 1974. The MFA placed restrictions on the import by industrialized countries of textiles from developing countries. For China and other WTO members, however, textile quotas under the MFA expired at the end of 2004 as agreed in the Uruguay Round of trade negotiations in 1994. A 2019 study found that Vietnam's WTO entry led to substantial gains in productivity for private firms, but had no impact on state-owned enterprises. In the absence of state-owned enterprises, "the overall productivity gains would have been about 40% larger in a counterfactual Vietnamese economy."

Development since 1997

Vietnam's economic policy following the 1997 Asian Financial Crisis has been a cautious one, emphasizing macroeconomic stability rather than growth. While the country shifted toward a more market-oriented economy, the Vietnamese government still continues to hold a tight rein over major state sectors, such as the banking system, state-owned enterprises and foreign trade. GDP growth fell to 6% in 1998 and 5% in 1999. The economy saw continuous real GDP growth of at least 5% since 2000.

The signing of the Bilateral Trade Agreement (BTA) between the United States and Vietnam on July 13, 2000, was a significant milestone. The BTA provided for "normal trade relations" (NTR) status of Vietnamese goods in the U.S. market. It was expected that access to the U.S. market would allow Vietnam to hasten its transformation into a manufacturing-based, export-oriented economy. Furthermore, it would attract foreign investment, not only from the U.S., but also from Europe, Asia and other regions.

In 2001, the ruling Communist Party of Vietnam approved a 10-year economic plan that enhanced the role of the private sector, while reaffirming the primacy of the state.  Growth then rose to 6% to 7% between 2000 and 2002 even in the midst of the global recession, making it the world's second fastest-growing economy. At the same time, investment grew threefold and domestic savings quintupled.

In 2003, the private sector accounted for more than one-quarter of all industrial output. However, between 2003 and 2005, Vietnam fell dramatically in the World Economic Forum's global competitiveness report rankings, largely due to negative perceptions of the effectiveness of government institutions. Official corruption is endemic, and Vietnam lags in property rights, efficient regulation of markets, and labor and financial market reforms.

Vietnam had an average GDP growth of 7.1% a year from 2000 to 2004. The GDP growth was 8.4% in 2005, the second-largest in Asia, trailing only China's. The government estimated that GDP grew in 2006 by 8.17%. According to the Minister of Planning and Investment, the government targeted a GDP growth of around 8.5% in 2007.

On November 7, 2006, the General Council at the World Trade Organization (WTO) approved Vietnam's accession package. On January 11, 2007, Vietnam officially became the WTO's 149th member, after 11 years of preparation, including eight years of negotiation. The country's access to the WTO was intended to provide an important boost to the economy, as it ensured that the liberalizing reforms continue and created options for trade expansion. However, the accession also brought serious challenges, requiring the economy to open up to increasing foreign competition.

Vietnam's economy continues to expand at an annual rate in excess of 7%, one of the fastest-growing in the world, but it grew from an extremely low base, as it suffered the crippling effect of the Vietnam War from the 1950s to the 1970s, as well as the austerity measures introduced in its aftermath. In 2012, the communist party was forced to apologise about the mismanagement of the economy after large numbers of SOEs went bankrupt and inflation rose. The main danger has been over the bad debt in the banks totalling to 15% and forecast growth is 5.2% for 2012 but this is also due to the global economic crisis. The government has launched schemes to reform the economy, however, such as lifting foreign ownership cap from 49% and partially privatizing the country's state-owned companies that have been responsible for the recent economic downturn. By the end of 2013, the government is expected to privatize 25–50% of SOEs, only maintaining control on public services and military. The recent reforms have created a major boom in the Vietnamese stock market as confidence in the Vietnamese economy is returning.

Vietnam's current economic turmoil has given rise to question of a new period of changing political economy, however. Poverty remains to be the main concern on the national performance index as of 2018. The Provincial Governance and Public Administration Performance Index (PAPI) found that 28% of survey respondents cited poverty as their main problem. Most respondents agreed with the statement that "[P]overty reduction is imperative to ensuring that Vietnam becomes an advanced, developed country. The percentage of the poorest Vietnamese respondents who believed that their economic situation would worsen increased from 13% in 2016 to 26% in 2017. The percentage of respondents with health insurance increased from 74% in 2016 to 81% in 2017, with strongest gains in the rural population groups.

In 2017, Transparency International, a non-profit that tracks graft ranked Vietnam as 113th worst out of 176 countries and regions for perceptions of corruption. Several graft cases found in 2016 and 2017 led to the corruption crackdown which prosecuted many bankers, businesspeople, and government officials under charges of corruption. PAPI found that bribery at public district hospital services decreased from 17% in 2016 to 9% in 2017. Reports of land seizures went down from an average of about 9% before 2013, to less than 7% in 2017. The number of respondents who believed that their land was sold at a fair market value decreased from 26% in 2014 to 21% in 2017. Land-use graft and petty graft, such as police officers accepting bribes, are common. According to Ralph Jennings, Vietnam has been privatizing many of its state-owned operations to reduce corruption and increase efficiency.

As of March 2018, Vietnam's economy continued to grow, achieving the best annual growth rate in over a decade; which has led media outlets to speculate if in the near future it could be one of the Asian tigers.

According to DBS Bank in 2019, Vietnam's economy has the potential to grow at a pace of about 6%-6.5% by 2029. Vietnam can overpower Singapore's economy by the next decade because of its strong foreign investment inflow and productivity growth. However, Vietnam has surpassed Singapore just a year later.

In the early 2020s, despite trade wars with Vietnam's major trade partners, a pandemic and the increasing trend in deglobalisation, Vietnam has still managed to become Asia's top-performing economy. Since 2000, Vietnam has now managed to manufacture higher-value goods with better paying jobs due to its more highly skilled workers. These workers now produce electronics which makes up 38% (in 2020) of Vietnam's exports (compared to 14% in 2010). The country had achieved an average of 6.2% in economic growth (faster than any other country in Asia after China).

Data 
The following table shows the main economic indicators in 1990–2020 (with IMF staff stimtates in 2021–2027). Inflation below 5% is in green.

Economic sectors

Agriculture, fishery and forestry

In 2003, Vietnam produced an estimated 30.7 million cubic meters of wood. Production of sawn wood was a more modest 2,950 cubic meters. In 1992, in response to dwindling forests, Vietnam imposed a ban on the export of logs and raw timber. In 1997, the ban was extended to all timber products except wooden artifacts. During the 1990s, Vietnam began to reclaim land for forests with a tree-planting program.

Vietnam's fishing industry, which has abundant resources given the country's long coastline and extensive network of rivers and lakes, has generally experienced moderate growth. In 2003, the total catch was about 2.6 million tons. However, seafood exports increased fourfold between 1990 and 2002 to more than US$2 billion, driven in part by shrimp farms in the South and "catfish", which are a different species from their American counterparts, but are marketed in the United States under the same name. By selling vast quantities of shrimp and catfish to the U.S., Vietnam triggered antidumping complaints by the U.S., which imposed tariffs in the case of catfish and was considering doing the same for shrimp. In 2005, the seafood industry began to focus on domestic demand to compensate for declining exports.

Vietnam is one of the top rice exporting countries in the world, but the limited sophistication of small-scale Vietnamese farmers causes quality to suffer. Vietnam is also the world's second-largest exporter of coffee, trailing behind Brazil.

Vietnam produced in 2018:

 44.0 million tons of rice (5th largest producer in the world, behind China, India, Indonesia and Bangladesh);
 17.9 million tons of sugarcane (16th largest producer in the world);
 14.8 million tons of vegetable;
 9.8 million tons of cassava (7th largest producer in the world);
 4.8 million tonnes of maize;
 2.6 million tonnes of cashew nut (largest producer in the world);
 2.0 million tons of banana (20th largest producer in the world);
 1.6 million tons of coffee (2nd largest producer in the world, only behind Brazil);
 1.5 million tons of coconut (6th largest producer in the world);
 1.3 million tons of sweet potato (9th largest producer in the world);
 1.2 million tons of watermelon;
 1.1 million tons of natural rubber (3rd largest producer in the world, behind Thailand and Indonesia);
 852 thousand tons of orange (18th largest producer in the world);
 779 thousand tons of mango (including mangosteen and guava);
 654 thousand tons of pineapple (12th largest producer in the world);
 270 thousand tons of tea (6th largest producer in the world);

In addition to smaller productions of other agricultural products.

In 2018, Vietnam was the world's 5th largest producer of pork (3.8 million tonnes). This year the country also produced 839 thousand tons of chicken meat, 334 thousand tons of beef, 936 million liters of cow's milk, 20 thousand tons of honey, among others.

Energy, mining and minerals

Petroleum is the main source of energy, followed by coal, which contributes about 25% of the country's energy (excluding biomass). Vietnam's oil reserves are in the range of 270–500 million tons.

In 2003, mining and quarrying accounted for 9.4% of GDP, and the sector employed 0.7% of the workforce. Petroleum and coal are the main mineral exports. Also mined are antimony, bauxite, chromium, gold, iron, natural phosphates, tin, and zinc.

In 2019, the country was the 9th largest world producer of antimony; 10th largest producer of tin in the world; the 11th largest producer of bauxite; the 12th largest world producer of titanium ; the 13th largest world producer of manganese and the 9th largest producer of phosphate in the world. The country is also one of the world's largest producers of  ruby, sapphire, topaz and spinel.

Crude oil was Vietnam's leading export until the late 2000s, when high-tech electrical manufactures emerged to become the biggest export market (by 2014, crude oil comprised only 5% of Vietnamese exports, compared to 20% of all exports in 1996). This is in part because Vietnam crude oil peaked in 2004, when crude oil represented 22% of all export earnings. Petroleum exports are in the form of crude petroleum because Vietnam has a very limited refining capacity. Vietnam's only operational refinery, a facility at Cat Hai near Ho Chi Minh City, has a capacity of only . Refined petroleum accounted for 10.2% of total imports in 2002. As of 2012, Vietnam had only one refinery, the Dung Quat refinery, but a second one, the Nghi Son Refinery was planned and was scheduled for construction in May 2013.

Vietnam's anthracite coal reserves are estimated at 3.7 billion tons. Coal production was almost 19 million tons in 2003, compared with 9.6 million tons in 1999. Vietnam's potential natural gas reserves are 1.3 trillion cubic meters. In 2002, Vietnam brought ashore 2.26 billion cubic meters of natural gas. Hydroelectric power is another source of energy. In 2004, Vietnam confirmed plans to build a nuclear power plant  with Russian assistance, and a second by a Japanese group.

Industry and manufacturing

Although the industrial sector contributed 40.1% of GDP in 2004, it employed only 12.9% of the workforce. In 2000, 22.4% of industrial production was attributable to non-state activities. From 1994 to 2004, the industrial sector grew at an average annual rate of 10.3%. Manufacturing contributed 20.3% of GDP in 2004, while employing 10.2% of the workforce. From 1994 to 2004, manufacturing GDP grew at an average annual rate of 11.2%. The top manufacturing sectors — electronics, food processing, cigarettes and tobacco, textiles, chemicals, and footwear goods — experienced rapid growth. Benefits from its proximity to China with lower labor cost, Vietnam is becoming a new manufacturing hub in Asia, especially for Korean and Japanese firms. For instance, Samsung produces about 40% of its phones in Vietnam. In the past decade, a significant automotive industry has been developed. As of 2019 Samsung employs over 200,000 employees in the Hanoi-area of Vietnam to produce Smartphones, while offsourcing some manufacturing to China and manufacturing large portions of its phones in India. LG Electronics moved smartphone production to Vietnam from South Korea, in order to stay competitive. LG said that "Vietnam provides an "abundant labor force", as motivation for the move.

Services and tourism

In 2004, services accounted for 38.2% of gross domestic product (GDP). From 1994 to 2004, GDP attributable to the service sector grew at an average annual rate of 6.0%.

Tourism

In 2012, Vietnam welcomed 6.8 million international visitors and the number is expected to reach over 7 million in 2013. Vietnam keeps emerging as an attractive destination. In TripAdvisor's list of top 25 destinations Asia 2013 by travelers' choice, there are four cities of Vietnam, namely Hanoi, Ho Chi Minh City, Hoi An and Ha Long.

2016 was the first year ever which Vietnam welcomed over 10 million international visitors. Since then, this figure has continued to rise. In 2019, Vietnam with 18 million international visitors was fifth most visited country in the Asia-Pacific region as per World Tourism rankings released by the United Nations World Tourism Organization.

During the COVID-19 pandemic in Vietnam, the country has suspended issuance of all tourist visa since March 2020, as of September 2020, the country is still closed for foreign tourists, with plans to reopen for tourism from a limited number of Asian countries. The country recorded a 98% year-on-year drop in foreign visitors for April 2020. With no reopening for tourists in sight, the government has called for the promotion of domestic tourism. Total tourism revenues dropped by over 60% year-on-year for July 2020.

Labour Export

The export of labour, that is the sending of Vietnamese workers to work in other countries, is also key to the Vietnamese economy, with much of their earnings being sent back to Vietnam. This labour export was disrupted due to the  Covid pandemic, but this year, 2022, Vietnam hopes to send 90,000 workers abroad. Traditional destinations have included South Korea, Japan, Malaysia, and Chinese Taipei, and now Vietnam is aiming for Germany, Russia, and Israel.

Banking and finance

Banking

The most important banks are the state-owned VietinBank, BIDV, and Vietcombank, which dominate the banking sector. There is also a trend of foreign investment into profitable banks. For example, VietinBank is currently owned by Bank of Tokyo Mitsubishi UFJ (19.73%) while Vietcombank is owned by Mizuho (15%).

(NOTE: Average exchange rates of 2020. Source: tradingeconomics.com. 1 USD = 23,286 VND)

Finance
Vietnam has two stock trading centers, the Ho Chi Minh City Securities Trading Center and the Hanoi Securities Trading Center, which run the Ho Chi Minh Stock Exchange (HOSE) and the Hanoi Stock Exchange (HNX), respectively.

Currency, exchange rate and inflation

Currency
The currency used in Vietnam is the đồng, shortened as VND or đ.

Exchange rate
The exchange rate between the U.S. dollar and the Vietnamese đồng is important because the dong, although not freely convertible, is loosely pegged to the dollar through an arrangement known as a "crawling peg". This mechanism allows the dollar–dong exchange rate to adjust gradually to changing market conditions. As of December 5, 2018, a US dollar is worth 23,256 Vietnamese đồng.

Gold still maintains its position as a physical currency to a certain extent, although it has seen its economic role declining in recent years.

Inflation
Vietnam saw high inflation in 1980s. During this period, there was excessive demand for the industrial sector development, food, and other commodities. In order to stimulate supply, government attempted co-integration of parallel and planned market. Though the initial reform in the 1980s raised the total output, due to the report being partial, it also led to the CPI inflation rate being pushed to 200% in 1982. To tackle this, govt introduced forced savings which can be understood as the accumulation of unspent money to make the monetary overhang.

Vietnam's economy experienced a hyperinflation period in its early years of the extensive reform program, especially from 1987 to 1992.

In 2008, inflation was tracking at 20.3% for the first half of the year, higher than the 3.4% in 2000, but down significantly from 160% in 1988.

In 2010, inflation stood at 11.5%, and 18.58% in 2011.

At the end of 2012, inflation stood at 7.5%, a substantial decrease from 2011.

In 2013, inflation stood at 6%, and 4.09% in 2014. In 2016, it was only 2%

Mergers and acquisitions
With 1,120 inbound deals with a cumulated value of almost 15 bil. USD,  there is a tremendous interest by foreign companies to get access to the Vietnamese market or continue the expansion using mergers and acquisitions. From 1991 to February 2018, Vietnamese companies were involved as either an acquiror or an acquired company in 4,000 mergers and acquisitions with a total value of 40.6 bil. USD. The mergers and acquisitions activities faced many obstacles, lowering the rate of success of the transaction. Common obstacles come from culture, transparency and legal aspects. The Institute for Mergers, Acquisitions and Alliances that has been active in Vietnam since 2006 and its M&A expert Christopher Kummer think that after the peak in 2016 and 2017 the trend will decrease in 2018. Among the largest and most prominent transactions since 2000 are:

All of the top 10 deals are inbound into Vietnam and none are outbound.

Trade

Economic relations with the United States are improving, but are not without challenges. Although the United States and Vietnam reached a landmark bilateral agreement in December 2001, which helped increase Vietnam's exports to the United States, disagreements over textile and catfish exports are hindering full implementation of the agreement. Further disrupting the economic relations between the two countries were efforts in Congress to link non-humanitarian aid to Vietnam's human rights record. Barriers to trade and intellectual property are also within the purview of bilateral discussions.

Given neighboring China's rapid economic ascendancy, Vietnam highly values its economic relationship with China. Following the resolution of most territorial disputes, trade with China is growing rapidly, and in 2004, Vietnam imported more products from China than from any other country. In November 2004, the Association of Southeast Asian Nations (ASEAN), of which Vietnam is a member, and China announced plans to establish the world's largest free-trade area by 2010.

Vietnam became a member of the World Trade Organization (WTO) on January 11, 2007.

In December 2015, Vietnam joined the ASEAN Economic Community along with the 9 other ASEAN members. The community's goal is to integrate the 10 members of ASEAN and bring a freer flow of labor, investment and trade to the region.

Foreign trade
Since Đổi Mới in 1986, Vietnam has increased trading, growing both exports and imports in double digits ever since. More recently, alarms on trade account deficits have been raised domestically, especially after joining the WTO in 2007. Throughout the next five years after 2007, Vietnam ran a trade deficit with the rest of the world in the tens of billions of dollars, with the record trade deficit in 2008 of US$18 billion.

The account deficit has since decreased. In 2012, Vietnam recorded a trade surplus of US$780 million, the first trade surplus since 1993. Total trade reached US$228.13 billion, an increase of 12.1% from 2011. In 2013, Vietnam recorded the second year of trade surplus of US$863 million. In 2014, Vietnam recorded the third year of trade surplus of US$2.14 billion, the largest trade surplus ever in history. Three years later, in 2017, it surpassed itself with a record of $2.92 billion.

Exports

In 2004, Vietnam's exports of merchandise were valued at US$26.5 billion, and, were growing rapidly along with imports. Vietnam's principal exports were crude oil (22.1%), textiles and garments (17.1%), footwear (10.5%), fisheries products (9.4%) and electronics (4.1%). The main destinations of Vietnam's exports were the United States (18.8%), Japan (13.2%), China (10.3%), Australia (6.9%), Singapore (5.2%), Germany (4.0%), and the United Kingdom (3.8%).

In 2012, export rose 18.2%, valued at US$114.57 billion. Vietnam's main export market included the EU with US$20 billion, United States with US$19 billion, ASEAN with $US 17.8 billion, Japan with US$13.9 billion, China with US$14.2 billion, and South Korea with US$7 billion.

In 2013, exports rose 15.4%, valued at US$132.17 billion, of which export of electronics now comprised 24.5% of total export, compared with a 4.4% in 2008. Textiles and garments are still an important part in Vietnam's export, valued about US$17.9 billion in 2013.

In 2014, exports rose 13.6%, reaching US$150.1 billion. Electronics and electronics parts, textiles and garments, computers and computer parts are the three main export groups of Vietnam. The United States continued to be Vietnam's largest export market, with US$28.5 billion. The EU is second with US$27.9 billion, ASEAN is third, China is fourth and Japan is the fifth largest export market of Vietnam.

Imports
In 2004 Vietnam's merchandise imports were valued at US$31.5 billion, and growing rapidly. Vietnam's principal imports were machinery (17.5%), refined petroleum (11.5%), steel (8.3%), material for the textile industry (7.2%), and cloth (6.0%). The main origins of Vietnam's imports were China (13.9%), Taiwan (11.6%), Singapore (11.3%), Japan (11.1%), South Korea (10.4%), Thailand (5.8%), and Malaysia (3.8%).

Vietnam import rose 6.6% in 2012, valued at US$113.79 billion.  Major import countries were China US$29.2 billion, ASEAN with US$22.3 billion, South Korea with US$16.2 billion, Japan with US$13.7 billion, EU with US$10 billion, and United States with US$6.3 billion.

In 2014, imports rose 12.1%, reaching US$148 billion, most of which are materials and machinery needed for export. China continued to be Vietnam's largest import partner, with US$43.7 billion. The ASEAN is second with US$23.1 billion, South Korea is third, Japan is fourth and the EU is the fifth largest import partner of Vietnam.

External debt, foreign aid and foreign investment

In 2004, external debt amounted to US$16.6 billion, or 37% of GDP.

From 1988 to December 2004, cumulative foreign direct investment (FDI) commitments totaled US$46 billion. By December 2004, about 58% had been dispersed. About half of FDI has been directed at the two major cities (and environs) of Ho Chi Minh City and Hanoi. In 2003 new foreign direct investment commitments were US$1.5 billion. The largest sector by far for licensed FDI is industry and construction. Other sectors attracting FDI are oil and gas, fisheries, construction, agriculture and forestry, transportation and communications, and hotels and tourism. From 2006 to 2010, Vietnam hoped to receive US$18 billion of FDI to support a targeted growth rate in excess of 7%. Despite rising investments, foreign investors still regard Vietnam as a risky destination, as confirmed by recent survey by the Japan External Trade Organization of Japanese companies operating in Vietnam. Many of the respondents complained about high costs of utilities, office rentals and skilled labor. Corruption, bureaucracy, lack of transparent regulations and the failure to enforce investor rights are additional obstacles to investment, according to the U.S. State Department. Vietnam tied with several nations for the 102nd place in Transparencies International's Corruption Perceptions Index in 2004. A study was conducted to examine the effect foreign investment had on corruption in Vietnam. The study concluded that the propensity of foreign firms to bribe at entry is higher in restricted sectors. Also, the removal of investment restrictions leads to reductions in bribery as a result of more Foreign Investment Enterprises, and consequently more competition entering that sector.

The World Bank's assistance program for Vietnam has three objectives: to support Vietnam's transition to a market economy, to enhance equitable and sustainable development and to promote good governance. From 1993 through 2004, Vietnam received pledges of US$29 billion of official development assistance (ODA), of which about US$14 billion, or 49%, has been disbursed. In 2004, international donors pledged ODA of US$2.25 billion, of which US$1.65 billion actually was disbursed. Three donors accounted for 80% of disbursements in 2004: Japan, the World Bank, and the Asian Development Bank. From 2006 to 2010, Vietnam hopes to receive US$14 billion to US$15 billion of ODA.

Pledged foreign direct investment US$21.3 billion for 2007 and a record US$31.6 billion for the first half of 2008. Mergers and acquisitions have gradually become an important channel of investments in the economy, especially after 2005.

Free trade agreements
 ASEAN Free Trade Area (AFTA)
 ASEAN–Australia–New Zealand Free Trade Area (AANZFTA) is a free trade area between ASEAN and ANZCERTA, signed on 27 February 2009 and coming into effect on 1 January 2010. Details of the AANZFTA agreement are available online.
 ASEAN–China Free Trade Area (ACFTA), in effect as of 1 January 2010
 ASEAN–India Free Trade Area (AIFTA), in effect as of 1 January 2010
 ASEAN–Japan Comprehensive Economic Partnership (AJCEP)
 ASEAN–Korea Free Trade Area (AKFTA), in effect as of 1 January 2010
 Comprehensive Economic Partnership for East Asia
 Comprehensive and Progressive Agreement for Trans-Pacific Partnership.
 On 29 May 2015, Vietnam signed a Free Trade Agreement (FTA) with Eurasian Economic Union.
European Union-Vietnam Free Trade Afreement (EVFTA) came into effect on 1 August 2020.
 Vietnam-Chile Free Trade Agreement (VCFTA) came into effect on 1 January 2014.
 Vietnam-Korea Free Trade Agreement (VKFTA) came into effect on 20 December 2015.
 Japan-Vietnam Economic Partnership Agreement came into effect on 1 October 2009.

Economic development strategy

Guiding principle

Industrialization and Modernization (IM)
"Industrialization and modernization is a process of fundamental and all-rounded change of production, business, services and social and economic management from the predominant use of artisanal labor to a predominant use of labor power17 with technology, methods and ways of working that are advanced, modern and rely upon the development of industry and scientific – technical progress to create high labor productivity. So from a theoretical and practical view industrialization and modernization are a necessary historical process that Vietnam must go through change our country into an industrial country […]"

- 7th National Congress-Central Committee (1991)

Socialist-Oriented Market Economy (SOME)
"The nature of a socialist-oriented market economy in our country:
 It is not an economy managed according in the style of a centralized bureaucratic subsidized system
 It is not a free market capitalist economy
 It is not yet entirely a socialist-oriented economy. This is because our country is in the period of transition to socialism, and there is still a mixture of, and a struggle between, the old and the new, so there simultaneously are, and are not yet sufficiently, socialist factors"

- 7th National Congress-Central Committee (1991)

Development strategy

Trade liberalization
Over the past 30 years, Vietnam has signed numerous trade agreements with different partners, promoting the country as one of the main manufacturing hubs in the world. In 1995, Vietnam joined the ASEAN community. In 2000, it signed a free trade agreement with the United States, to be followed by admission to the World Trade Organisation in 2007. Since then, the country has further integrated itself into the world economy with bilateral agreements with other ASEAN countries, China, India, Japan, and Korea, to name a few. Vietnam has actively working with other partners on ratifying the Trans-Pacific Partnership to form CP TPP, or TPP-11, after the withdrawal of the US, in order to promote economic cooperation, regional connectivity and promote economic growth between member countries. The World Bank estimates that the CP TPP would help the country's GDP to grow by 1.1% by 2030 with a boost to productivity. The overall impact of these efforts was the lowering of tariffs on both imports and exports to and from Viet Nam, and an improved trade balance with a surplus of $2.8 billion during the first eight months of 2018 (Vietnam Custom Department). Most recently, on June 30, 2019, Vietnam signed the Free Trade Agreement and Investment Protection Agreement with the EU after 10 years of negotiation, making it only the fourth country in Asia which managed to sign such agreement with the western bloc (after Japan, South Korea, and Singapore)

Domestic reform
The government has made real effort in changing its mindset toward a more open market economy, lowering the cost of doing business, and putting regulation in place to ensure rights and orders. In 1986 the government passed its first Law on Foreign Investment, allowing foreign companies to operate in Vietnam. The constitution has come a long way since, with the law being revised regularly to cater for a more investor-friendly business environment while aiming to reduce red-tape and accelerate foreign investment into the country. The Global Competitiveness Report by World Economic Forum placed Vietnam at 55th in 2017, rising from 77th place in 2006 . In the World Bank's Ease of Doing Business rankings, Viet Nam also rose from 104th place in 2007 to 68th place in 2017. The Bank commended Vietnam on progress made in enforcing contracts, increasing access to credit and basic infrastructure, and trading, among other factors.

Human and physical capital investment
Vietnam invested a lot in its human capital and infrastructure. With a growing population – 96 million today, up from 60 million in 1986, and more than half are under the age of 35– Vietnam made large public investments in education, especially making primary education universal and compulsory. This was necessary, given the country's export-led growth strategy, where literacy for the mass workforce is deemed important for growth in the manufacturing sector. On the other hand, Vietnam also invested heavily in infrastructure, ensuring cheap mass access to necessities like electricity, water, and especially the internet. These two factors together helped Vietnam to become a hub for foreign investment and manufacturing in Southeast Asia. Japanese and Korean electronics companies like Samsung, LG, Olympus, and Pioneer built factories, and countless European and American apparel makers set up textile operations in the country. Intel opened a $1 billion chip factory in 2010, signalling the importance of Vietnam's strategic positioning in the eyes of the international business community.

Sustainable growth
Economic growth in Vietnam was considered as broadly in line with other developing countries. The Inclusive Development Index by WEF put Vietnam in a group of countries that have done particularly well and advancing in the ranking of the world's most inclusive economies. This has been notably evident with the role of women participating in the economy. Their labor force participation rate is within 10% of that of men, a smaller gap than many other countries according to World Bank, and in 2015 women-led households are generally not poorer than those led by men. Primary and secondary enrollment rates for boys and girls are also essentially the same, and more girls continue studying in high school than boys. The government is actively reviewing and adjusting its policy, as shown in the current official Development Strategy Action Plan 2011–2020, to develop appropriate mechanisms for a more equitable growth across the country; promoting the advantages of each regions, working in collaboration with each other to support and amplify the fruit of development.

In 2017, with the help of the United Nations, Vietnam official started the ground work to achieve the Sustainable Development Goals with the development of the "One Strategic Plan", integrating the SDGs with the nation's Socio-Economic Development Strategy (2011-2020) and Socio-Economic Development Plan (2016-2020). The OSP can be used as a guideline for government agencies to implement the SDGs in the most effective ways, focusing on areas of importance, such as: investing in people, climate resilience and environmental sustainability, prosperity and partnership, justice and inclusive governance. Vietnam has also developed a National Action Plan to review current growth policies and update these to align with the interest of the SDGs. This is done in consultation with ministries, local governments, and other stakeholders so that a common framework can be set forward.

Economic indicators and international rankings

Notes

References

Literature

External links

 Vietnam economy
 Vietnam Business Facts
 National Securities Center
 Securities
 Vietnam Exports, Imports and Trade Balance  World Bank
 Vietnam : "Doi moi" and the World Crisis  (article)
 Mergers and Acquisitions in Vietnam's Emerging Market Economy: 1990-2009
 Tariffs applied by Vietnam as provided by ITC's ITC Market Access Map , an online database of customs tariffs and market requirements

 
Vietnam